The Old County Ground is cricket ground, located at West Malling, historically called Town Malling, in the English county of Kent. It is known to have been used for cricket matches in 1705 and has been the home ground of Town Malling Cricket Club since their formation in 1827. Known under various names throughout its existence, the ground hosted 14 first-class cricket matches between 1836 and 1890.

History
The ground is first believed to have been used in 1705 in what is the first recorded organised cricket match to take place in Kent. A West Kent side played one from Chatham Cricket Club for a wager of 11 guineas a man. Sides from Town Malling first used it in 1799 and Town Malling Cricket Club was formed at the ground in 1827 by Thomas Selby and Silas Norton, partners in a law firm in the town.

Originally known as the New Cricket Ground, by 1830 the ground had become known as George Field when a match between Town Malling and Benenden attracted 8,000 spectators. Selby and Norton, backed financially by William Harris, 2nd Baron Harris, recruited Fuller Pilch to be the groundsman in 1835. Pilch, who was considered the greatest batsman in the country at the time, was from Norfolk and played cricket as a professional. He was paid £100 a year to play for the club, manage the ground and run the adjoining public house, the Cricketers.

Selby and Norton organised a series of matches between Town Malling sides and county teams or ones selected by MCC as England XIs. A total of 11 matches took place between 1836 and 1841, ten of which were given retrospective first-class cricket status and are considered to have been played by a Kent team. The other match was played against a Kent side in 1836, attracting up to 6,000 spectators.  Pilch played for Town Malling in this match but otherwise played in the Kent side, having qualified by residence, including the three against England sides. The first of these was a benefit match for Pilch and saw Kent defeat England by two runs.

Despite Selby and Norton's ambitions, Town Malling proved to be too small to support a formally organised county club and Kent County Cricket Club was formed from the Beverley club in Canterbury during the 1842 Canterbury Cricket Week. Pilch moved to the new Kent club to play as well as to manage the Beverley Ground and run the Saracen's Head inn in the city as well. The new Kent club was focussed on playing matches at Canterbury and first-class cricket did not return to Town Malling until 1878.

Kent played four further matches on the ground between 1878 and 1890, two in 1878 and one in 1879 before the final match in 1890. Several players were critical of the ground – Francis MacKinnon complained of having to change in an oast house, with access via a stepladder, while William Patterson found "neither the gate nor the accommodation satisfactory". Kent's match with Sussex in 1890 was the final first-class fixture played on the ground. The ground was used for occasional Kent Second XI matches from 1903 to 1914.

The ground is reputed to be the inspiration for Dickens' portrayal of a cricket match between All Muggleton and Dingley Dell in The Pickwick Papers. The depiction of the match that was used on the back of the series E ten pound note includes a church which is modelled on West Malling's parish church.

Records on the ground
A total of 14 first-class matches have been played on the ground, all featuring Kent sides as the home team.
Highest total: 262 by Lancashire against Kent, 1878
Lowest total: 27 by Kent against Sussex, 1836
Highest partnership: 80, 3rd wicket by R Daft and J Selby, for Nottinghamshire against Kent, 1878
Highest individual score: 81, VPFA Royle, for Lancashire against Kent, 1878
Best bowling in an innings: 9 wickets, FW Lillywhite, for Sussex against Kent, 1836 and W Clarke, Nottinghamshire against Kent, 1840
Best bowling in a match: 15/35, F Morley, for Nottinghamshire against Kent, 1878

The number of runs conceded by Lillywhite and White in taking nine wickets in an innings are unknown. It was not usual in the early Victorian period for the runs conceded by a bowler to not be included in the scores kept.

Matches contested before 1842 were contested by a team representing Kent before the formation of the first Kent Cricket Club at Canterbury in August 1842. Matches held between 1878 and 1890 were contested by the formal Kent County Cricket Club which was constituted in 1870.

Current ground
At the time scores were shown in the window of an oast house on the side of the ground and it was used for other outdoor events in the town. It was described by The Times:

It is a fine old ground in delightful surroundings and is blessed with excellent natural turf such as is rarely to be found on cricket grounds
– The Times, 13 August 1926

The ground was bought by an anonymous benefactor at auction in August 1926 and later purchased by Kent County Council in 1929. It is still in use by Town Malling Cricket Club, who negotiated a 35-year lease with the council in 1987, with the option of purchasing the ground should the council wish to sell it. A new pavilion was opened by Kent cricketer Richard Ellison in 1992 and the lease was extended for another 100 years in 2016 after the ground had been purchased by West Malling Parish Council in 1994. Other than its continued use by Town Malling Cricket Club, it is also used regularly as the home ground of Town Malling United football club.

References

Cricket grounds in Kent
West Malling